Rabbitville may refer to a place in the United States:

 Rabbitville, Indiana, an unincorporated community
 Rabbitville, Missouri, an unincorporated community